Noor Pur Baghan (Punjabi,) is a village located in the Jhelum District of Punjab, Pakistan. It forms a part of Dina Tehsil and comes under the Janjeel Union Council. The village is also referred as NPB.

Education

This village has two primary schools, one for boys and one for girls.

References

Villages in Jhelum District
Populated places in Jhelum District